TV3 Norway is a commercial television channel targeting Norway owned by Viaplay Group. It was separated from the earlier Pan-Scandinavian version in 1990.

Unlike its main rivals, NRK, TV 2 and TVNorge, the channel does not broadcast from Norway but from West Drayton, Middlesex in the United Kingdom, even if the channel is almost solely aimed at Norwegian viewers. This excludes the channel from the strict rules in Norway that apply to advertising (ban on advertisements aimed at children or interrupting programs). Also unlike the other main channels, it wasn't available on analogue terrestrial, having to rely on satellite and cable television for its distribution. With the launch of digital terrestrial television in October 2007, the channel became available terrestrially.

On 3 August 2009 TV3 launched a new visual identity and a new logo. The new visual identity mostly uses purple colour. The identity had rolled out to Denmark and Hungary, as TV3 Norway was the first to use it.

On 1 August 2011 TV3 launched a new visual identity and a new logo, which used mostly yellow colour.

Programming

Sports
TV3 had sports on their schedule before they moved all their sports programming to their sister channel Viasat4.

Former sports programs
Serie A
Formula One
SAS Ligaen
UEFA Champions League
Norway national football team away games
Motorsports
Boxing
Handball
Sailing

Logos

See also 
 Television in Norway

References

External links
 TV3 Norway official site

 
Television channels in Norway
TV3 Norway
Television channels and stations established in 1990
Television channel articles with incorrect naming style
1990 establishments in Norway